Disculella spirulina is a species of gastropod in the Geomitridae family. 

It is endemic to the island Madeira, Portugal. Its natural habitat is temperate grassland. It is threatened by habitat loss.

References

 Bank, R. A.; Neubert, E. (2017). Checklist of the land and freshwater Gastropoda of Europe. Last update: July 16th, 2017
 Cameron, R. A. D., Teixeira, D., Pokryszko, B., Silva, I. & Groh, K. (2021). An annotated checklist of the extant and Quaternary land molluscs of the Desertas Islands, Madeiran Archipelago. Journal of Conchology. 44(1): 53-70.

External links
 Cockerell, T. D. A. (1921). The helicoid group Disculella Pilsbry. The Nautilus. 35(1): 12-13
 Lowe, R. T. (1852). Brief diagnostic notices of new Maderan land shells. The Annals and Magazine of Natural History. (2) 9 (50): 112-120; (2) 9 (52): 275-279. London

Molluscs of Madeira
Endemic fauna of Madeira
Disculella
Taxonomy articles created by Polbot